An election was held on November 8, 2016 to elect all 110 members to Michigan's House of Representatives. The election coincided with elections for other offices, including U.S. President, U.S. House of Representatives and Senate. The primary election was held on August 2, 2016.

There was no change in the composition of the House as Republicans retained control, winning 63 seats compared to 47 seats for the Democrats.

Members elected at the 2016 election served in the 99th Michigan Legislature which convened on January 11, 2017.

Background
Over one-third of the House could not seek re-election because of term-limits, with the legislators who were elected in the 2010 mid-term elections, that saw the House Republican conference pick up 21 seats, the largest net gain for one party in an election since Michigan's newly constituted term-limits went into effect in 1992.

Term-limited members
Under the Michigan Constitution, members of the state Senate are able to serve only two four-years terms, and members of the House of Representatives are limited to three two-years terms. The following members were prevented by term-limits from seeking re-election to the House in 2016.

Democrats (13)
 2nd District: Alberta Tinsley-Talabi
 9th District: Harvey Santana
 14th District: Paul Clemente
 15th District: George Darany
 18th District: Sarah Roberts
 26th District: Jim Townsend
 31st District: Marilyn Lane
 50th District: Charles Smiley
 53rd District: Jeff Irwin
 54th District: David Rutledge
 92nd District: Marcia Hovey-Wright
 96th District: Charles Brunner

Republicans (25)
 20th District: Kurt Heise
 23rd District: Pat Somerville
 24th District: Anthony G. Forlini
 30th District: Jeff Farrington
 32nd District: Andrea LaFontaine
 33rd District: Ken Goike
 46th District: Bradford Jacobsen
 57th District: Nancy Jenkins
 64th District: Earl Poleski
 66th District: Aric Nesbitt
 70th District: Rick Outman
 72nd District: Ken Yonker
 77th District: Tom Hooker

 79th District: Al Pscholka
 83rd District: Paul Muxlow
 85th District: Ben Glardon
 86th District: Lisa Lyons
 87th District: Mike Callton
 89th District: Amanda Price
 97th District: Joel Johnson
 99th District: Kevin Cotter
 100th District: Jon Bumstead
 101st District: Ray Franz
 102nd District: Phil Potvin
 103rd District: Bruce Rendon
 106th District: Peter Pettalia
 108th District: Ed McBroom

Results

Statewide
Statewide results of the 2016 Michigan House of Representatives:

District
Results of the 2016 Michigan House of Representatives election by district:

Election matchups
Following the primary elections on August 2, general election matchups and results in each district were as follows:

Districts 1-28

Districts 29-55

Districts 56-83

Districts 84-110

Special Elections

1st District
The 1st District seat became vacant after Democratic state Rep. Brian Banks had to resign from the legislature as part of plea agreement with the office of Michigan Attorney General Bill Schuette. In exchange for his resignation from the House, the state would just drop multiple felony counts against Banks in which he was alleged to falsify documents to obtain a private loan before he was elected to the state House. Banks agreed to plead guilty to one misdemeanor and spend one day in the Wayne County Jail.

Results

Democratic Primary

Republican Primary

General Election

109th District

Background
The 109th District seat became vacant after state Rep. John Kivela committed suicide just hours after he was arrested for drunk driving for the second time during his time in the legislature.

Results

Democratic Primary

Republican Primary

General Election

68th District

Background
On November 7, 2017, term-limited Democratic state Rep. Andy Schor was elected mayor of Lansing, to succeed Virg Bernero. Schor will take office on January 1, 2018. After Schor formally resigns from the House, Gov. Rick Snyder will call a special election to fill the remaining balance of Schor's term, which expires January 1, 2019.

Notes

References

External links
2016 Michigan Primary Election Ballot

Michigan House of Representatives
House of Representatives
2016
November 2016 events in the United States